
The Vela supernova remnant is a supernova remnant in the southern constellation Vela. Its source Type II supernova exploded approximately 11,000–12,300 years ago (and was about 800 light-years away). The association of the Vela supernova remnant with the Vela pulsar, made by astronomers at the University of Sydney in 1968, was direct observational evidence that supernovae form neutron stars.

The Vela supernova remnant includes NGC 2736. The Vela supernova remnant overlaps the Puppis A supernova remnant, which is four times more distant. Both the Puppis and Vela remnants are among the largest and brightest features in the X-ray sky.

The Vela supernova remnant is one of the closest known to us. The Geminga pulsar is closer (and also resulted from a supernova), and in 1998 another near-Earth supernova remnant was discovered, RX J0852.0-4622, which from our point of view appears to be contained in the southeastern part of the Vela remnant. One estimate of its distance puts it only 200 parsecs away (about 650 ly), closer than the Vela remnant, and, surprisingly, it seems to have exploded much more recently, in the last thousand years, because it is still radiating gamma rays from the decay of titanium-44. This remnant was not seen earlier because when viewed in most wavelengths, it is lost in the Vela remnant.

See also
 CG 4
 List of supernova remnants
 List of supernovae

References

External links
 
 
 
 
 
 
 Gum Nebula (annotated)
 Bill Blair's Vela Supernova Remnant page 

Gum Nebula
Supernova remnants
Vela (constellation)